San Juan, Puerto Rico, held an election for mayor on November 2, 2004. It was held as part of the 2004 Puerto Rican general election. It saw the reelection incumbent mayor Jorge Santini, a member of the New Progressive Party. Santini ran unchallenged.

Results

References

2004
San Juan, Puerto Rico mayoral
San Juan, Puerto Rico